Bolivar is an unincorporated community in Tangipahoa Parish, Louisiana, United States.

History
Bolivar was named for the first postmaster, Bolivar Varnado.

References

Unincorporated communities in Tangipahoa Parish, Louisiana
Unincorporated communities in Louisiana